Fearless Love is the eleventh studio album by American rock/pop musician Melissa Etheridge, released on April 27, 2010 by Island/Def Jam Music Group, produced by John Shanks. Etheridge said in an interview the album is "about being fearless. It's about choosing love over fear. It's a way, a philosophy of living life that suits me well." The album was recorded at the Document Room in Malibu, and Hensons Studios in Hollywood, CA. It features twelve tracks on the standard release and two bonus tracks on the deluxe edition.

Production
The album was produced by John Shanks, and co-produced by Etheridge. In an interview Etheridge stated about Shanks, she said: "He and I have a great relationship and I knew he could understand my desire to really get back to the rock and roll roots of myself and my music. He certainly did all that and more."

Reception

Chart history
Fearless Love was widely viewed as Etheridge's "return to rock" after a more introspective and blues-influenced album in The Awakening. She embarked on an extensive promotional tour in support of the album, performing the lead single on QVC, Oprah, The Tonight Show with Jay Leno, Dancing with the Stars, The View, Good Morning America, and Ellen.

In its first week on the Billboard 200, Fearless Love debuted at #7, selling 46,000 copies. Although the number of albums sold was nearly identical to The Awakening'''s first week, this album debuted six spots higher on the chart. It was her highest charting debut since Your Little Secret, which debuted at #6 in 1995. As of 2012 the album has sold 158,000 copies in United States.

Critical reception
Critical reception towards the album was mixed and positive. At Metacritic, which assigns a rating to reviews from mainstream critics, it holds a "mixed or average reviews" score of 59% based on seven reviews.Rolling Stone gave it 3.5 stars out of 5, calling the album, Melissa's "feistiest disc since her 1988 debut."The New York Times praised the "broad, bruising rock arrangements."The Boston Globe also noted that the rock tracks are the ones when Etheridge's "scarred, emotive croon works its visceral voodoo."

AllMusic was less positive, giving the album 2 stars out of 5 and criticizing the "oppressive" production.NU.nl states that "despite a strong and promising opening, Fearless Love gets trapped halfway in (...) cliché-filled lyrics against a backdrop of insignificant heartland rock and schmalzy power ballads."

Track listing
All songs written by Melissa Etheridge.

"Fearless Love" – 4:28
"The Wanting of You" – 4:12
"Company" – 4:53
"Miss California" – 4:00
"Drag Me Away" – 4:41
"Indiana" – 5:28
"Nervous" – 3:12
"Heaven on Earth" – 3:47
"We Are the Ones" – 5:39
"Only Love" – 5:43
"To Be Loved" – 5:16
"Gently We Row" – 5:11

Bonus tracks
"The Heart of a Woman" – 5:16
"Away" – 4:37

Personnel
Melissa Etheridge – vocals, acoustic guitar, mando-guitar
John Shanks – acoustic guitar, electric guitar
Sean Hurley – bass guitar
Jamie Muhoberac – keyboards
Charles Judge – additional keyboards and synthesizer (tracks 3–6)
Joss Stone – backing vocals (track 9)
Natasha Bedingfield – backing vocals (track 9)
Victor Indrizzo – drums
Satnam Ramgotra – tabla (track 9)
The line "We are the ones we have been waiting for''" (track 9) originates from June Jordan's Poem for South African Women. Copyright 2005 June Jordan Literary Estate Trust.
Engineered and mixed by Jeff Rothschild

References

2010 albums
Melissa Etheridge albums
Albums produced by John Shanks
Island Records albums